Frederik Arentz (5 June 1702 in Stadsbygd, Trøndelag – 22 November 1779 in Bergen) was the Lutheran bishop of Bjørgvin from 1762 to 1774.

Biography 
Arentz attended the Trondheim Cathedral School and graduated in theology at the University of Copenhagen in 1719. Then he studied in Halle under professor August Hermann Francke and worked as a private teacher until 1727. In 1729, he was appointed as pastor (sogneprest) in Askvoll, in the Diocese of Bergen, until he became a pastor in Nykirken i Bergen in 1760. In 1762, he became bishop of Bjørgvin.

Arentz was the husband of Ludvig Holberg's niece Cathrine Fredrikke Holberg. They had several children, including:
 Hans Arentz (1731–1793), lawyer and sorenskriver in Sunnfjord
 Fredrich Christian Holberg Arentz (1736–1825), theologian and rector of the Bergen Cathedral School.

Works

Sources

 
 
 
 

1702 births
1779 deaths
People from Trøndelag
People from Trondheim
People from Askvoll
People educated at the Trondheim Cathedral School
University of Copenhagen alumni
Bishops of Bjørgvin